Soebatsfontein is a settlement in Namakwa District Municipality in the Northern Cape province of South Africa.

Settlement 80 km south-west of Springbok and 48 km north-west of Kamieskroon. The name, Afrikaans for ‘begging or pleading fountain’, dates from an incident about 1898 in which Hendrik , a farmhand, was murdered by San in spite of his begging for mercy.

References

Populated places in the Kamiesberg Local Municipality